Duane Earl Singleton (born August 6, 1972) is a former Major League Baseball center fielder. Singleton was drafted by the Milwaukee Brewers in the fifth round of the 1990 Major League Baseball Draft. He played with the team at the Major League level for two seasons before being traded to the Detroit Tigers for minor league player Henry Santos in 1996. Singleton played one season with the Tigers before being released by the team later in the year.

References

External links

Sportspeople from Staten Island
Baseball players from New York City
Milwaukee Brewers players
Detroit Tigers players
Major League Baseball center fielders
1972 births
Living people
Bridgeport Bluefish players
American expatriate baseball players in Australia
African-American baseball players
American expatriate baseball players in Canada
Midland Angels players
Vancouver Canadians players
Toledo Mud Hens players
New Orleans Zephyrs players
Stockton Ports players
El Paso Diablos players
Salinas Spurs players
Beloit Brewers players
Arizona League Brewers players
21st-century African-American sportspeople
20th-century African-American sportspeople